Pratigya may refer to:

Pratiggya, a 1940s Hindi film
Pratigya (1975 film), a Hindi film starring Dharmendra
 Pratigya (2008 film), an Bhojpuri language Indian film
 Pratigyabadh, a 1991 Hindi film
 Mann Kee Awaaz Pratigya, an Indian soap opera that airs on Star Plus